Shahzadipur, also spelled Sahzadepur, is a village in Gosainganj block of Lucknow district, Uttar Pradesh, India. As of 2011, its population is 847, in 161 households. It is part of the gram panchayat of Rasulpur Ashik Ali.

References 

Villages in Lucknow district